Buchholz-Kämpen [German: Buchholz-Kämpen] is a city-district of Witten-Herbede, which is a part of the City of Witten, (North Rhine-Westphalia, Germany). Buchholz-Kaempen is placed about 12 kilometres southeast of the city.

Buchholz

History
Buchholz is one of the oldest settlement places in the Ruhr valley. About 2000 years ago the first settlers came to the valley of Buchholz. Since the 19th century there is steel industry in Buchholz, until the late 1920s there have also been several coal mines.

Town of Blankenstein / Herbede / Witten
In its history Buchholz belonged to several counties. In 1966 it became a city-district of the new founded City of Blankenstein. Just three years later the town Blankenstein became a part of the City of Hattingen while Buchholz became a part of the City of Herbede. When Herbede was incorporated to Witten in 1975 Buchholz became part of the new founded city-district Buchholz-Kaempen.

Curios
Because Buchholz had previously been part of Hattingen, it is assigned phone code 02324 (Hattingen) and not 02302 (Witten).

Kaempen
Kaempen was founded in 1926.

Witten
Former municipalities in North Rhine-Westphalia